Marion Township is one of nine townships in Decatur County, Indiana. As of the 2010 census, its population was 1,638 and it contained 667 housing units.

History
Marion Township was organized in 1831.

Geography

Cities and towns
 Millhousen

Unincorporated towns
 Slabtown
 Tarkeo Corner
 Smyrna
(This list is based on USGS data and may include former settlements.)

Adjacent townships
 Washington Township (north)
 Salt Creek Township (northeast)
 Jackson Township, Ripley County (southeast)
 Columbia Township, Jennings County (south)
 Sand Creek Township (west)

Major highways
  U.S. Route 421

Cemeteries
The township contains four cemeteries: Antioch, Burks Chapel, Mount Pleasant, and Immaculate Conception Catholic Cemetery.

References
 United States Census Bureau cartographic boundary files
 U.S. Board on Geographic Names

External links

 Indiana Township Association
 United Township Association of Indiana

Townships in Decatur County, Indiana
Townships in Indiana
1831 establishments in Indiana
Populated places established in 1831